Two Royal Navy ships have carried the name Duke of Wellington

 , a 131-gun first-rate ship of the line of the Royal Navy
 , a steamer renamed Duke of Wellington during the Second World War for service as a Landing Ship, Infantry

See also
 
 

Royal Navy ship names